The .17-223 is a centerfire wildcat rifle cartridge. It is based on the .223 Remington, but the neck is re-sized to accept a .17 caliber bullet.

See also
.17 Remington
List of rifle cartridges
4 mm caliber

References

External links
.17-Caliber Ultra Bomb! By Dave Moreton

Pistol and rifle cartridges
Wildcat cartridges